Reino Paukkonen (born 20 September 1945) is a Finnish long-distance runner. He competed in the marathon at the 1972 Summer Olympics.

References

External links
 

1945 births
Living people
Athletes (track and field) at the 1972 Summer Olympics
Finnish male long-distance runners
Finnish male marathon runners
Olympic athletes of Finland
People from Heinävesi
Sportspeople from South Savo